Laager Point is a conspicuous headland extending out from President Beaches on Byers Peninsula, Livingston Island in the South Shetland Islands, Antarctica facing Astor Island. It forms the southeast entrance point for New Plymouth harbour and the northeast entrance point for Osogovo Bay. Naiad Lake is situated on  the southwest side of the point and Pistiros Lake is centred 900 m east of it. The area was visited by 19th century sealers.

The feature's name (meaning ‘Camp Point’) derives from an earlier Spanish form, ‘’Punta Campamento’’, given by Chilean researchers in 1971.

Location

Maps
 Península Byers, Isla Livingston. Mapa topográfico a escala 1:25000. Madrid: Servicio Geográfico del Ejército, 1992.
 L.L. Ivanov et al. Antarctica: Livingston Island and Greenwich Island, South Shetland Islands. Scale 1:100000 topographic map. Sofia: Antarctic Place-names Commission of Bulgaria, 2005.
 L.L. Ivanov. Antarctica: Livingston Island and Greenwich, Robert, Snow and Smith Islands. Scale 1:120000 topographic map.  Troyan: Manfred Wörner Foundation, 2009.  
 Antarctic Digital Database (ADD). Scale 1:250000 topographic map of Antarctica. Scientific Committee on Antarctic Research (SCAR). Since 1993, regularly upgraded and updated.
 L.L. Ivanov. Antarctica: Livingston Island and Smith Island. Scale 1:100000 topographic map. Manfred Wörner Foundation, 2017.

References
 SCAR Composite Antarctic Gazetteer.

Headlands of Livingston Island